Turritriton labiosus, also known as Cymatium labiosum, is a species of predatory sea snail, a marine gastropod mollusc in the family Cymatiidae.

Description 
The maximum recorded shell length is 30 mm.

Habitat 
The minimum recorded depth for this species is 0.2 m; the maximum recorded depth is 91 m.

References

 Gofas, S.; Le Renard, J.; Bouchet, P. (2001). Mollusca. in: Costello, M.J. et al. (eds), European Register of Marine Species: a check-list of the marine species in Europe and a bibliography of guides to their identification. Patrimoines Naturels. 50: 180-213

External links 
 Wood, W. (1828). Supplement to the Index Testaceologicus; or A catalogue of Shells, British and Foreign. Richard Taylor, London. Iv (+1) + 59 pp., plates 1-8
 Nevill, G.; Nevill, H. (1874). Descriptions of new marine Mollusca from the Indian Ocean. Journal of the Asiatic Society of Bengal. 43(2): 21-30, 1 pl.
 Adams, A. & Angas, G. F. (1864). Descriptions of new species of shells, chiefly from Australia, in the collection of Mr. Angas. Proceedings of the Zoological Society of London. 1864: 35-40.
 Menke, K. T. (1843). Molluscorum Novae Hollandiae specimen. Hannover: Libraria Aulica Hahniana. 46 pp
 Lischke, C. E. (1870). Diagnosen neuer Meeres-Conchylien von Japan. Malakozoologische Blätter. 17: 23-29., 
 Petit de la Saussaye S. (1852). Description de coquilles nouvelles. Journal de Conchyliologie. 3: 51-59.
 Powell A. W. B., New Zealand Mollusca, William Collins Publishers Ltd, Auckland, New Zealand 1979 
 Photo
 Gofas, S. (2010). Cymatium labiosum (Wood W., 1828). In: Bouchet, P.; Gofas, S.; Rosenberg, G. (2010) World Marine Mollusca database. Accessed through: World Register of Marine Species at http://www.marinespecies.org/aphia.php?p=taxdetails&id=141106 on 2011-02-17

Cymatiidae
Gastropods described in 1828
Taxa named by William Wood (zoologist)